The Wolf of the Malveneurs (French: Le loup des Malveneur) is a 1943 French mystery horror film directed by Guillaume Radot and starring Madeleine Sologne, Pierre Renoir and Gabrielle Dorziat. It was shot at the Cité Elgé studios in Paris with location shooting at the Château d'Anjony in Tournemire. The film's sets were designed by the art director Marcel Magniez. It is Gothic in style with use of chiaroscuro lighting. It was part of a group of films produced in German-occupied France that used fantasy or historical costume settings to subtly express dissent.

Synopsis
The Malveneur family live at the same gloomy, isolated castle in the countryside they have held for centuries. The current owner Reginald de Malveneur strongly believes in an ancient curse that turned one of his ancestors into a werewolf. As he has only a daughter rather than a son he will be the last of the line, unless his obsessive scientific experiments in his laboratory bear fruit. A young governess arrives from Paris to educate Malveneur's daughter. When both Malveneur, his gamekeeper and his wife disappear or die within weeks of each other, the governess join forces with a young painter to investigate the mystery.

Cast
 Madeleine Sologne as Monique Valory
 Pierre Renoir as 	Reginald de Malveneur
 Gabrielle Dorziat as 	Magda
 Michel Marsay as 	Philippe
 Marie Olinska as Estelle Malveneur
 Marcelle Géniat as 	Marianne
 Louis Salou as Dr. Andrieu
 Yves Furet as 	Firmin
 Jo Dervo as 	Dr. Giraud
 Henri Charrett as 	Le Garde-Chasse
 Bijou  as Geneviève

References

Bibliography
 Bertin-Maghit, Jean Pierre. Le cinéma français sous Vichy: les films français de 1940 à 1944. Revue du Cinéma Albatros, 1980.
 Deighan, Samm. The Legacy of World War II in European Arthouse Cinema. McFarland, 2021.
 Hutchings, Peter. The A to Z of Horror Cinema. Scarecrow Press, 2009.

External links 
 

1943 films
1940s French-language films
1943 mystery films
French mystery films
1943 horror films
French horror films
Films directed by Guillaume Radot
1940s French films